The Aelita Award is an award for science fiction writers founded by the Union of Writers of the Russian Federation (formerly the Soviet Writers Union) and "Uralsky Sledopyt Magazine" in 1981. It was named after the classic Russian science fiction novel Aelita. The prize is awarded during the Aelita, a Soviet/Russian science fiction fandom convention.

In 1989, the Start Award was created as a runner-up award to the Aelita.

A number of other awards are or have been given in conjunction with the Aëlita ceremony. These include:

The Ivan Yefremov Memorial Award, named in honor of science fiction writer and paleontologist Ivan Yefremov (1908-1972) and recognizes great contributions to the development of Soviet science fiction studies.

The Vitaly Bugrov Memorial Award is given in honor of science fiction writer, editor and critic Vitaly Bugrov (1938-1994) for great contributions to the writing of story collections and nonfiction works. He was also instrumental in the founding of the Aëlita Award.

The Order of the Knights of Science Fiction & Fantasy is given for great contributions to Russian fandom.

The Europe-Asia Award is given for writers who reflect or represent Ekaterinburg and the Urals in their writing.

The Order of Kindness & Light is given for writers who promote in their works ideas of humaneness, kindness and a positive attitude towards humanity.
The Master of Science Fiction & Fantasy Award is like the Grand Master Award given by the Science Fiction Writers of America (SFWA).

The Velikoye Koltso (Great Ring) Award was established by Boris Zavgorodny and was re-established by the Alkor Fan Club. It is given by Soviet fandom for their favorite novel, and physically resembles the American Hugo Award.

Aelita Award winners 
1981 – (tie) Arkady and Boris Strugatsky, Alexander Kazantsev
1982 – Zinovi Yuriev
1983 – Vladislav Krapivin
1984 – Sergej Snegow 
1985 – Sergey Pavlov
1986 – Viktor Kolupaev
1987 – Olga Larionova
1988 – Viktor Kolupaev
1989 – Sever Gansovsky
1990 – Oleg Korabelnikov
1991 – Vladimir Mikhailov
1992 – Sergei Drugal
1993 – Vasily Zvyagintsev
1994 – Gennadiy Prashkevich
1995 – No award given.
1997 – Kir Bulychov
1998 – Eugeniy Gulyakovskiy
1999 – Sergey Lukyanenko
2000 – Vadim Shefner
2001 – Marina and Sergey Dyachenko
2002 – Eugeniy Lukin
2003 – Vladimir Savchenko
2004 – Vasili Golovachov
2006 – Alexander Gromov
2007 – No award given.
2008 – Svyatoslav Loginov
2009 – Vladimir Vasilyev
2010 – Andrey Lazarchuk
2011 – H. L. Oldie
2012 – Pavel Amnuel
2013 – Roman Zlotnikov
2014 – Isay Davydov
2015 – Vyacheslav Rybakov
2016 – Evgeny Filenko
2017 – Andrei Belyanin
2018 – Vadim Panov

Start Award winners 
1989 – Boris Shtern
1990 – Andrei Stolyarov
1991 – Vyacheslav Rybakov
1992 – Alexander Tyurin & Alexander Shchiogolev
1993 – Sergei Lukyanenko
1994 – Andrei Shcherbak-Zhukov
1995 – No award given.
1996 – No award given.
1997 – Andrei Valentinov
1998 – Mikhail Tyrin
1999 – Andrey Plekhanov
2000 – Natalya R'azanova
2001 – Victor Burtsev
2002 – Leonid Kaganov
2003 – Vitaly Kaplan

Award discontinued?

Ivan Yefremov Memorial Award winners 
1987 – Georgi Gurevich
1988 – (tie) Dmitri Bilenkin & Vitaly Bugrov
1989 – Georgii Grechko
1990 – Viktor Babenko
1991 – Igor Khalymbahdza
1992 – Andrei Balabukha
1993 – 
1994 – 
1995 – 
1996 – 
1997 – Evgeniya Sterligova
1998 – Alexander Kashirin
1999 – Alexander Sidorovich
2000 – Nina Berkova
2001 – Vladimir Borisov
2002 – Bella Kl'ueva
2003 – Dmitriy Vatolin
2004 – 
2005 – 
2006 – 
2007 – 
2008 – 
2009 – 
2010 – 
2011 – 
2012 – Andrey Sinitsin

Award discontinued?

Vitaly Bugrov Memorial Award winners 
1997 – Vladimir Gakov
1998 – Sergei Kazantsev
1999 – Yevgeny Kharitonov
2000 – Vladimir Gopman
2001 – Alexander Royfe
2002 – Dmitriy Baykalov
2003 – Eugeny Permyakov
2004 – 
2005 – 
2006 – 
2007 – 
2008 – 
2009 – 
2010 – 
2011 – 
2012 – Sergei Chekmaev

Award discontinued?

References
The Encyclopedia of Science Fiction, Peter Nicholls & John Clute, eds. London: Granada, 1979.
Reginald's Science Fiction & Fantasy Awards, by Daryl F. Mallett & Robert Reginald. San Bernardino, CA: The Borgo Press, 1991, 1993, 2013.

Soviet science fiction
Science fiction awards
Russian science fiction
Russian literary awards
Soviet literary awards
A